Gisèle of France (c. 968 – 1002) was the daughter of Hugh Capet and Adelaide of Aquitaine. She married Count Hugh I of Ponthieu around 994. Gisela's children by Hugh included:
Enguerrand I of Ponthieu
Giselberthe de Encre (c. 990-1041)
Alexis de Bernâtre (c. 1000-1057)
Guy of Ponthieu

References

Sources

French princesses
French countesses
960s births
1002 deaths
Year of birth uncertain
Year of death uncertain
10th-century French women
11th-century French women
10th-century French people
11th-century French people
Daughters of kings